The imperial election of 1519 was an imperial election held to select the emperor of the Holy Roman Empire.  It took place in Frankfurt on the 28th of June.

Background 
The election followed the death of Maximilian I, Holy Roman Emperor on January 12, 1519.  The two main candidates were his grandson Charles, duke of Burgundy, king of Spain and archduke of Austria, and Francis I of France, king of France. Maximilian’s son (Charles’s father), Philip IV of Burgundy had died in 1506. 

Henry VIII of England, king of England, also presented himself as a candidate. Electing an emperor who was also the ruler of a kingdom outside of the Empire had not happened since the king of Sicily, Frederick II, Holy Roman Emperor was elected in 1212, while France and the Empire had not been joined since the days of the Carolingian dynasty.

The seven prince-electors called to elect Maximilian's successor were:

 Albert of Brandenburg, elector of Mainz
 Richard von Greiffenklau zu Vollrads, elector of Trier
 Hermann of Wied, elector of Cologne
 Louis II of Hungary, king of Bohemia
 Louis V, Elector Palatine, elector of the Electoral Palatinate
 Frederick III, Elector of Saxony, elector of Electorate of Saxony
 Joachim I Nestor, Elector of Brandenburg, elector of Brandenburg

Charles could count on the vote of Louis II, who was married to his younger sister Mary of Hungary.  He and Francis competed to exceed one another in their bribery of the remaining electors.

Elected 
Charles was the head of the Austrian House of Habsburg after the death of his grandfather Maximilian, but he was born in the Burgundian low countries, had grown up speaking French and Dutch, was in Spain at the time of the election, and had not yet been to Germany and learned German. Thus, there was a risk that he could be felt to be as much of a foreigner as Francis. However, Charles advised the princes against electing a foreign king and declared himself a "German by blood and stock".

Therefore, he underwent a relentless propaganda campaign in which he shifted the narrative to claim his heritage as the head of a German dynasty and as the grandson of Maximilian (previous Holy Roman Emperor) and presented Francis as nothing more than a 'foreign adventurer', fostering fears of foreign interference in German affairs. Consequentially, he obtained  'German sympathies', making his election more attractive. 

Another factor in favor of Charles was that he, as the ruler of sparse states in the Low Countries, Spain, and Austria, was less likely to impose his personal ambitions over German princes as he would also be pre-occupied on his other affairs. In contingency with this notion, Charles promised to guarantee 'German liberties'. At the same time, the threat of military force from the Swabian League, formed in 1488 and sympathetic towards Charles's Habsburg background, also influenced the result.

In addition, Charles had deeper pockets. Francis had bought the elector of Trier; up for grabs were the electors of Mainz, Brandenburg, and the Palatinate. Although full details of the election were never revealed, it is possible that the electors sought a way out of their dilemma by electing Frederick III as emperor, but that he turned them down.

All these factors made Charles's election much more attractive than his competition. In the end, Charles was elected unanimously.

Aftermath 
Charles was crowned at Aachen on October 26, 1520  and later by Pope Clement VII in Bologna on February 22, 1530.  He was the last emperor to accept the papal coronation.

Sources

1519
1519 in the Holy Roman Empire
16th-century elections
Non-partisan elections
Charles V, Holy Roman Emperor
Francis I of France
Henry VIII